Giuseppe Di Palo (born 12 March 1968) is an Italian rower. He competed in the men's eight event at the 1988 Summer Olympics.

References

1968 births
Living people
Italian male rowers
Olympic rowers of Italy
Rowers at the 1988 Summer Olympics
Place of birth missing (living people)